5160 Camoes, provisional designation , is an asteroid from the inner regions of the asteroid belt, approximately 6 kilometers in diameter. The asteroid was discovered on 23 December 1979, by Belgian astronomer Henri Debehogne and Brazilian astronomer Edgar Netto at ESO's La Silla Observatory in northern Chile. It was later named for Portuguese poet Luís de Camões.

Orbit and classification 

Camoes orbits the Sun in the inner main-belt at a distance of 2.2–2.6 AU once every 3 years and 9 months (1,359 days). Its orbit has an eccentricity of 0.07 and an inclination of 8° with respect to the ecliptic. The asteroid's observation arc starts in 1979, as no precoveries were taken and no identifications were made prior to its discovery.

Physical characteristics 

Based on an absolute magnitude of 13.3 and assuming a generic albedo over the range of 0.05 to 0.25, Camoes measures between 6 and 12 kilometers in diameter.

According to the survey carried out by NASA's Wide-field Infrared Survey Explorer with its subsequent NEOWISE mission, Camoes measures 6.0 kilometers in diameter and its surface has an albedo of 0.259. As of 2016, the asteroid's composition, rotation period and shape remain unknown.

Naming 

This minor planet was named after Portugal's and the Portuguese language's greatest poet, Luís de Camões (1524–1580). His epic Os Lusíadas (The Lusiads), a fantastical interpretation of the Portuguese voyages of discovery during the 15th and 16th centuries, shows an extraordinary knowledge of astronomy. The official naming citation was published by the Minor Planet Center on 6 February 1993.

References

External links 
 Asteroid Lightcurve Database (LCDB), query form (info )
 Dictionary of Minor Planet Names, Google books
 Asteroids and comets rotation curves, CdR – Observatoire de Genève, Raoul Behrend
 Discovery Circumstances: Numbered Minor Planets (5001)-(10000) – Minor Planet Center
 
 

005160
Discoveries by Henri Debehogne
Discoveries by Edgar Rangel Netto
Named minor planets
19791223